Prahlad Acharya (born 1973) is a magician, illusionist, escapologist, and stunt performer from Udupi, Karnataka, India. Known for his escape acts, Prahlad has been termed Indian Houdini by the Indian media. He also performs ventriloquism and  shadow play. His show is called Maya Jadoo, which is a 20-member performance of Indian illusions. Prahlad calls his combination of drama and magic "dramagic"

He is married to Poornima Acharya, who is also a magician.

Achievements 
Prahlad's performances include:

Escape from Bangalore Central Prison within 10 seconds on 10 December 2001
Unique Shadow Play Performance at Gili Gili 2001 - the International Magicians' Convention at Udupi in November 2001
Udupi Golden Chariot Vanish at Udupi Sri Krishna Temple on 1 September 2001
1000th Magical Performance of MAYA JADOO, at the PPC Auditorium, Udupi on 7 April 2001
Car Vanishing Act at the Karavali Utsav, Mangalore on 14 February 2001
Outstanding Magician Award at Vismayam 2000 - the International Magicians' Convention at Trivandrum, Kerala in December 2000
Houdini escape at the Jog Falls, the India's tallest waterfall on 20 May 2000
Gold Medal for Ventriloquism & Silver Medal for Close Up Magic at the Golden Magic Conference at Kanhangad, Kerala in November 1999
Escape from the Maximum Security Prison at Bellary within eight seconds on 2 October 1999
Magic-on-wheels to create election awareness in Udupi District in 1998
Founded the Magic & Allied Arts Development & Research Institute in Udupi on 14 January 1998
Performance of the Legendary Indian Rope Trick at Kadekar, Udupi in November 1997 
Jagruti Rally - A blind-fold drive for AIDS Awareness from Mangalore in Karnataka to Panjim in Goa in May 1995.
Agnivyooha Chhedana (Escape from the Castle of Fire) at Udupi in September 1994.
Chinese Torture Cell Escape at Udupi in 1994.
Underwater Houdini Escape at Madhwa Sarovar in Udupi in 1993.

References

External links
 Magician Prahlad Acharya's official website 
 Prahlad Acharya's Page on IM 
 Prahlad Acharya's Page on WoM 
 Indian Magicians Web Site 
 
 The illusionist, featuring Magician Philip, Prahlad Acharya and Nakul Shenoy

Indian magicians
People from Udupi
Mangaloreans
1973 births
Living people
Tulu people